The Japan Cooperative Party (Nihon Kyōdōtō) was a political party in Japan.

History
The party was established by Katsutarō Kita in August 1946 when he was expelled from the Cooperative Democratic Party due to his refusal to compromise on the cooperative aspect of party policy during merger talks with Shinseikai. The new party was named after the original Japan Cooperative Party, which had merged into the Cooperative Democratic Party in May 1946.

In 1947 it was dissolved when Kita formed the Japan Farmers Party.

References

Defunct political parties in Japan
Political parties established in 1946
1946 establishments in Japan
Political parties disestablished in 1947
1947 disestablishments in Japan